Osea Naiqamu (2 August 1961 – 23 January 2022) was a Fijian politician and member of the Parliament of Fiji. As a member the FijiFirst Party, Naiqamu served as the Minister for Forestry.

Naiqamu was re-elected to Parliament in the 2018 election. He died in Natabua on 23 January 2022.

References

20th-century births
1961 births
2022 deaths
I-Taukei Fijian members of the Parliament of Fiji
FijiFirst politicians
Fijian civil servants
Government ministers of Fiji
People from Ba Province
Politicians from Ba Province